Rai 2 is an Italian free-to-air television channel owned and operated by state-owned public broadcaster RAI – Radiotelevisione italiana. It is the company's second television channel, and is known for broadcasting TG2 news bulletins, talk shows, reality television, drama series, sitcoms, cartoons and infotainment. In the 1980s it was known for its political affiliation to the Italian Socialist Party, it has shifted recently its focus towards the youth, including in its schedule reality shows, entertainment, TV series, news, knowledge and sports.

The second television channel in Italy, it was launched on 4 November 1961, seven years after RAI's first channel was launched on 3 January 1954. The channel was initially referred to as "Secondo Programma". It received other names, such as "Rete 2" and "Rai Due" until it adopted its current name "Rai 2". Its direct competitor to Mediaset's Italia 1. It is also a state-owned channel like Rai 1.

Logo

Programmes
A few programmes include:
TG2 (Newscast)
Quelli che... il Calcio
Castle
Desperate Housewives
ER
Eurovision Song Contest (semi-finals)
The Voice of Italy
Felicity
JAG
Las Vegas
Law & Order
Life on Mars
FBIFBI InternationalNCISNCIS: Los AngelesNCIS: New OrleansNUMB3RSOnce Upon a TimePast LifePopularPrimevalSIX (TV Series)Starsky and HutchS.W.A.T.UEFA Europa LeagueUEFA Europa Conference LeagueBullIl collegioPechino ExpressCartoons
 Baby Felix Digimon 
 The PowerPuff Girls Kid Paddle Ashita no Nadja Pretty Cure Teletubbies Monster Allergy Chaotic NASCAR Racers (Gare Nascar)
 Inazuma Eleven Franny's Feet Felix the Cat The Adventures of Tom Sawyer Sammy & Co. Tom Wheel Squad Anne of Green Gables Vicky the Viking Sea Princesses Stellina Loulou de Montmartre Code Lyoko (Note: the second, third and fourth series aired on Rai Gulp)
 Winx ClubKids Block
 Random/ Cartoon Flakes  (2005–2014)
  Go-Cart mattina  (1997–2005)

Not longer aired programmes

Until 1975 regular broadcasting was monochrome, with very few exceptions. Since late 1975, then called Rete 2 began airing some new shows in colour, then beginning semi-regular colour broadcasting during the autumn season (a few hours a week). Rai 1 followed its "sister network" a few months later. Eventually, regular broadcasting in colour began on 1 February 1977.Rischiatutto, one-hour-long Italian version of Jeopardy!, hosted by Mike Bongiorno, aired on Thursday night, from 5 February 1970, at 9:15 pm (in 1972 season at 9:30 pm). About 20 million viewers watched every episode of the show, the first one aired on Rai 2 to enter in the list of the Ten Most Watched Programmes on Italian TV during the year. The final two seasons (1973 and 1974) were aired on Rai 1.Ondalibera (known popularly as Televacca, Cow TV''), was a one-hour-long comedy and satirical show hosted by a very young Roberto Benigni in his television debut. In the show, the Tuscan peasant Mario Cioni (Benigni) hosts a programme aired in the fictional local channel Televacca, which has its headquarters in a stable full of hay and animals. Using a sometimes vulgar and desecrating speech, with a heavy Tuscan accent, Benigni improvised monologues and satirised the TV medium and the society. Co-hosts were the boor Monna (Carlo Monni) and his "daughter" Donatella, a Daisy Mae Yokum stylish young woman. Considered one of the most controversial programmes in Italian TV history, censored and interrupted after only four episodes despite being relatively successful, the programme debuted on 19 December 1976, airing on Sunday nights at 8:45 PM.

References

External links
 Official website 
 

Television channels and stations established in 1961
2
Italian-language television stations